Park Hae-il (born 26 January 1977) is a South Korean actor. He began his acting career in theater, but soon gained the film industry's attention in 2003 with Jealousy Is My Middle Name and Memories of Murder. Park's film career took off, with leading roles in films of diverse genres, including relationship drama Rules of Dating (2005), horror mystery Paradise Murdered (2007), and crime thriller Moss (2010). More recently, Park received Best Actor honors for his performance in the period action film War of the Arrows, which was the highest-grossing Korean film of 2011. He also received critical acclaim for his role as an aging poet in A Muse (2012).

Career
Park Hae-il began appearing in theatre productions ever since childhood, and he first established himself on stage rather than on the screen. In 2000 he was awarded the Best New Actor award in the theatre category of the Baeksang Arts Awards for his role in the play Cheongchun-yechan ("Ode to Youth"). His film debut was in a minor role of Yim Soon-rye's Waikiki Brothers, however he left a major impression in his second film Jealousy Is My Middle Name, in which he played a conflicted young man who develops a fascination/hatred for his boss, who has stolen two women from him. The film won the top prize at the Busan International Film Festival in 2002, and was released commercially the following spring.

Throughout his career, Park has been cast in two different types of roles: innocent-looking, boyish characters, or else men who hide a dark streak under a nice-looking exterior. After Jealousy, Park would take on his darkest role of all in the acclaimed smash hit Memories of Murder, where he portrayed a man suspected of committing serial murder. Yet the following year he was just as effective appearing in a romantic role opposite Jeon Do-yeon in time-travel drama My Mother, the Mermaid.

In 2005, he once again played characters of completely opposite temperament. In Rules of Dating, he plays a dirty-minded, scheming high school instructor who sets his mind on a pretty student teacher played by Kang Hye-jung, while in Boy Goes to Heaven he plays a young boy who suddenly finds himself an adult one day, ala Tom Hanks in Big.

2006 saw him return to work with acclaimed director Bong Joon-ho in the big-budget monster movie The Host which went on to become the best-selling Korean film of all time.

Murder mystery Paradise Murdered was a surprise hit in 2007, with Kyu Hyun Kim of Koreanfilm.org calling Park "an inspired choice for the ostensible protagonist, projecting fatigued compassion and cold calculation in equal measure, his obsidian pupils glistening with streaks of chilling obsession."

In 2008, he starred in the period drama Modern Boy, a dramatic love story set in 1930s Gyeongseong or old Seoul, when Korea was under Japanese colonization (1910–45). Park played the role of a rich, hedonistic playboy who cannot care less that his country was colonized, then falls head over heels in love with a beautiful and mysterious independence fighter (Kim Hye-soo).

After small supporting roles in Shim's Family (also known as Skeletons in the Closet), and Good Morning, President, Park joined the ensemble cast of A Million as one of eight participants who take part in a TV reality show in Perth, Australia but discover that they must literally survive to win the prize of 1 million dollars.

In 2010, Park headlined Kang Woo-suk's blockbuster mystery thriller Moss, playing a young man who comes to a rural village after hearing about his father's death and later becomes embroiled in its hidden secrets.
Park's casting was received enthusiastically by fans of the source material, Yoon Tae-ho's hugely popular online graphic novel series.

Heartbeat explores a familial love battle of wills, as Yeon-hee (played by Yunjin Kim of Lost fame) whose daughter is in desperate need of a heart transplant, tries to convince a brain-dead patient's son (Park) to sign off on the transplant, but he refuses and instead investigates his mother's fall. He then appeared in the low-budget indie End of Animal, because he found the script "very interesting."

Park next starred in War of the Arrows, a fictional tale set in the Joseon Dynasty, which follows Nam-yi (Park) on his search for younger sister Ja-in after she is kidnapped by Qing Dynasty soldiers during an invasion. As he slays enemy soldiers with his bow and arrow, he is confronted by Jushinta, a Manchu enemy commander also well known for his archery prowess. Arrow made headlines by selling to distributors from six countries at the Cannes film market and becoming the highest-grossing Korean film of 2011. Park won Best Actor honors at the prestigious Grand Bell Awards and Blue Dragon Film Awards.

He returned to the big screen in A Muse, a film adaptation of celebrated author Park Bum-shin's sensational novel about an old poet who ends up falling for a 17-year-old girl named Eun-gyo. Upon realizing his love for the teenager, the poet goes through emotional turmoil and self-destruction, while willing to give up his fame as one of the nation's most respected literary figures. The 35-year-old actor took on the challenge of nearly eight hours of makeup daily, on top of learning the weary gait and gesture of a man in his 70s.

After Yim Pil-sung's Weekend Prince was delayed, Park starred instead in Song Hae-sung's ensemble black comedy Boomerang Family (2013), and Zhang Lu's introspective romance drama Gyeongju (2014).

In December 2022, Park decided not to renew his contract with the former agency.

Personal life
Park married his longtime girlfriend Seo Yoo-seon on 11 March 2006; they have two children. Seo is a playwright and has also written an episode of KBS Drama Special titled Ji-hoon, Born in 1982.

Filmography

Film

Television series

Music video appearances

Theater

Awards and nominations

References

External links
 
 
 

South Korean male film actors
South Korean male stage actors
1977 births
Living people
People from Seoul
Male actors from Seoul
20th-century South Korean male actors
21st-century South Korean male actors